The 2020–21 S.C. Farense season is the club's 111th season in existence and the club's first consecutive season in the top flight of Portuguese football. In addition to the domestic league, S.C. Farense will participate in this season's editions of the Taça de Portugal and the Taça da Liga. The season covers the period from July 2020 to 30 June 2021.

Players

Current squad

Out on loan

Pre-season and friendlies

Competitions

Overview

Primeira Liga

League table

Results summary

Results by round

Matches

Taça de Portugal

Statistics

Goalscorers

Notes

References

External links

S.C. Farense seasons
S.C. Farense